The 1989 Belgian Open was a women's tennis tournament played on outdoor clay courts in Brussels, Belgium that was part of the Category 2 tier of the 1989 WTA Tour. It was the third edition of the tournament and was held from 17 July until 23 July 1989. Second-seeded Radka Zrubáková won the singles title.

Finals

Singles

 Radka Zrubáková defeated  Mercedes Paz 7–6(8–6), 6–4
 It was Zrubáková's only title of the year and the 1st of her career.

Doubles

 Manon Bollegraf /  Mercedes Paz defeated  Carin Bakkum /  Simone Schilder 6–1, 6–2
 It was Bollegraf's 3rd title of the year and the 4th of her career. It was Paz's 3rd title of the year and the 15th of her career.

External links
 ITF tournament edition details
 Tournament draws

Belgian Open
Belgian Open (tennis)
1989 in Belgian women's sport
1989 in Belgian tennis